Beganovi is a village in the municipality of Hadžići, Bosnia and Herzegovina.

Demographics 
According to the 2013 census, its population was 179.

References

Populated places in Hadžići